Zhang Gong (born 10 April 1992) is a Chinese footballer who currently plays for Guangzhou R&F in the Chinese Super League.

Club career
Zhang Gong started his professional football career in 2011 when he joined China League One side Shenyang Zhongze in 2011. He scored his first senior goal on 26 July 2014 in a 2–0 home victory against Beijing Institute of Technology. Zhang became an unattached player at the end of 2014 season after Shenyang Zhongze dissolved.

Zhang joined League One side Dalian Transcendence in March 2016. He made his debut for Dalian on 13 March 2016 in a 3–1 away victory against Shanghai Shenxin, coming on as a substitute for Quan Heng in the 66th minute. On 23 July 2016, he scored his first goal in the Dalian Derby which ensured Dalian Transcendence beat Dalian Yifang 2–1.

Zhang transferred to Chinese Super League side Guangzhou R&F on 19 November 2016. He made his debut for the club on 4 March 2017 in a 2–0 home win against Tianjin Quanjian, coming on for Chen Zhizhao in the 86th minute.

Career statistics
.

References

External links
 

1992 births
Living people
Chinese footballers
Footballers from Beijing
Dalian Transcendence F.C. players
Guangzhou City F.C. players
Chinese Super League players
China League One players
Association football midfielders